Coumermycin A1 is an aminocoumarin. Its main target is the ATPase site of the DNA Gyrase GyrB subunit.

See also 
 Chemically induced dimerization

References 

Antibiotics
Imidazoles